Saint Juliana of Nicomedia is said to have suffered Christian martyrdom during the Diocletianic persecution in 304. She was popular in the Middle Ages, especially in the Netherlands, as the patron saint of sickness.

Historical background
Both the Latin and Greek Churches mention a holy martyr Juliana in their lists of saints. The oldest historical notice of her is found in the Martyrologium Hieronymianum for 16 February, her place of birth being given as Cumae in Campania (In Campania Cumbas, natale Julianae).

It is true that the reference is contained only in the single chief manuscript of the above-named martyrology (the Codex Epternacensis). It is nevertheless clear that the notice is certainly authentic, from a letter of Saint Gregory the Great, which testifies to the special veneration of Saint Juliana in the neighbourhood of Naples. A pious matron named Januaria built a church on one of her estates, for the consecration of which she desired relics (sanctuaria, that is to say, objects which had been brought into contact with the graves) of Saints Severin and Juliana. Gregory wrote to Fortunatus II, Bishop of Naples, telling him to accede to the wishes of Januaria. Her life is listed in the Bibliotheca Hagiographica Graeca (BHG) 963 and  Bibliotheca Hagiographica Latina (BHL) 4522–4527.

The legend
The details of her biography are unclear. The Acts of Saint Juliana used by Bede in his "Martyrologium" may be legendary. According to this account, Saint Juliana, daughter of an illustrious pagan named Africanus, was born in Nicomedia; and as a child was betrothed to the Senator Eleusius, one of the emperor's advisors. Her father was hostile to the Christians. Juliana secretly accepted holy baptism. When the time of her wedding approached, Juliana refused to be married. Her father urged her not to break her engagement, but when she refused to obey him, he handed her over to the Governor, her former fiancé. Elusius again asked Juliana to marry him, but she again refused.

Juliana was beheaded after suffering torture in 304, during the persecution of Maximian. It is said that part of her torture was being partially burned in flames, plunged into a boiling pot of oil, and finally beheaded. Another Christian named Saint Barbara suffered the death of a martyr along with Juliana and was likewise sainted.

Soon after a noble lady named Sephonia came through Nicomedia and took the saint's body with her to Italy, and had it buried in Campania. Evidently it was this alleged translation that caused the martyred Juliana, honoured in Nicomedia, to be identified with the Saint Juliana of Cumae evidenced above, although they are quite distinct persons.

Alternate account
Juliana's parents were pagans and they wanted to betroth her with Eleusius, a prominent officer from Antioch, but Juliana denied strongly. Her denial left her parents surprised because until then she had never opposed them and she was an obedient daughter. Eleusius' ego was sorely injured and he sought revenge. He made some queries and found out that Juliana had converted to Christianity, though her parents knew nothing about this. Eleusius impeached her before the Roman governor and as a result she was arrested and put in jail.  While she was in prison, efforts to make her the wife of Eleusius continued, in order to save her from execution, but Juliana preferred to die rather than have a pagan as a husband. Then Eleusius after being ordered by the Roman governor and filled with hate flogged her in a ruthless way. After that, he burned her face with a heated iron and said at her, "Go now at the mirror to see your beauty".  Juliana answered him with a light smile: "At the resurrection of the righteous, there won’t exist burnings and wounds but only the soul. So Eleusius, I prefer to have now the wounds of the body which are temporary, rather than the wounds of the soul which torture eternal." After a while, Juliana was beheaded. Eleusius was later eaten by a lion, when he was shipwrecked on an unknown island.

Later history
  
The veneration of Saint Juliana of Nicomedia became very widespread, especially in the Netherlands. She became known as the patron saint of sickness.

At the beginning of the 13th century her remains were transferred to Naples. The description of this translation by a contemporary writer is still extant. The feast of the saint is celebrated in the Latin Church on 16 February, in the Greek on 21 December.

Since her Acts describe the conflicts which she is said to have with the devil, she is represented in pictures with a winged devil whom she leads by a chain. She is also shown enduring various tortures or fighting a dragon.

St. Juliana is the subject of an Anglo-Saxon poem, believed to have been written by Cynewulf in the eighth century.

See also
 Saint Juliana of Nicomedia, patron saint archive

References

Sources
Mombritius, Sanctuarium, II, fol. 41 v.-43 v.;
Acta SS., FEB., II, 808 sqq.;
J. P. Migne, P.G. CXIV, 1437–52;
Bibliotheca Hagiographica Latina, I, 670 sq.; Bibl. hagiogr. graeca (2nd. ed.), 134;
Nilles, Kalendarium manuale, I (2nd ed., Innsbruck, 1896), 359;
Mazocchi, In vetus S. Neapolitanae ecclesiae Kalendarum commentarius, I (Naples, 1744), 556–9;
Oswald Cockayne, St. Juliana (London, 1872)
Vita di S. Giuliana (Novara, 1889);
Oskar Backhaus, Ueber die Quelle der mittelenglischen Legende der hl. Juliana und ihr Verhaltnis zu Cynewulfs Juliana (Halle, 1899).

External links
 Life of St Juliana in the Golden Legend
 Catholic Forum: St Juliana with details of her iconography
 Santa Giuliana di Nicomedia

304 deaths
4th-century Roman women
Italian saints
Saints from Roman Anatolia
Roman Bithynia
4th-century Christian martyrs
Year of birth unknown
Late Ancient Christian female saints
Legendary Romans
People from İzmit